The Clayton-Marsh Creek-Greenville Fault is a fault located in the eastern San Francisco Bay Area of California, in Alameda County and  Contra Costa County. It is part of the somewhat parallel system of faults that are secondary to the San Andreas Fault.

Seismic activity 

The 5.8 magnitude 1980 Livermore earthquake occurred on this fault. The predicted probability of a major earthquake on this fault within the next 30 years is relatively low, at 3%, compared to nearby faults such as the Hayward Fault.

See also 
 Calaveras Fault
 Concord Fault

References 

Seismic faults of California
Geography of Alameda County, California
Natural history of Contra Costa County, California